Avec Amour (French "With Love") may refer to:

Avec Amour (Anna Prucnal album), 1981
Avec Amour (Azalia Snail album), 2005
Avec Amour, a 2012 box set by Serge Gainsbourg